Francis Warren Nicholls, Jr. (January 18, 1955 – March 31, 2014), better known as Frankie Knuckles, was an American DJ, record producer and remixer. He played an important role in developing and popularizing house music in Chicago during the 1980s, when the genre was in its infancy. In 1997, Knuckles won the Grammy Award for Remixer of the Year, Non-Classical. Due to his importance in the development of the genre, Knuckles was often called "The Godfather of House Music".

Musical career

1970s–1980s
Born in The Bronx, Knuckles and his friend Larry Levan began frequenting discos as teenagers during the 1970s. While studying textile design at the FIT, Knuckles and Levan began working as DJs, playing soul, disco, and R&B at two of the most important early discos, The Continental Baths and The Gallery. In the late 1970s, Knuckles moved from New York City to Chicago, where his old friend, Robert Williams, was opening what became the nightclub called Warehouse. When the club opened in Chicago in 1977, he was invited to play on a regular basis, which enabled him to hone his skills and style. This style was a mixture of disco classics, unusual indie-label soul, the occasional rock track, European synth-disco and all manner of rarities, which would all eventually codify as "House Music". The style of music now known as house was named after a shortened version of the name "Warehouse".

Knuckles was so popular that the Warehouse, initially a members-only club for largely black gay men, began attracting straighter, whiter crowds, leading its owner, Robert Williams, to eschew membership. Knuckles continued DJing at the Warehouse until November 1982, when he started his own club in Chicago, The Power Plant.

Around 1983, Knuckles bought his first drum machine to enhance his mixes from Derrick May, a young DJ who regularly made the trip from Detroit to see Knuckles at the Warehouse and Ron Hardy at the Music Box, both in Chicago. The combination of bare, insistent drum machine pulses and an overlay of cult disco classics defined the sound of early Chicago house music, a sound which many local producers began to mimic in the studios by 1985.

When his next club the Powerhouse closed in 1987, Knuckles moved to the UK for four months and DJ-ed at DELIRIUM!, a Thursday night party at Heaven (nightclub) in London. Chicago house artists were in high demand and having major success in the UK with this new genre of music. Knuckles also had a stint in New York, where he continued to immerse himself in producing, remixing, and recording. 1988 saw the release of Pet Shop Boys' third album, Introspective, which featured Knuckles as a co-producer of the song "I Want a Dog."

Work with Jamie Principle
In 1982, Knuckles was introduced to then-unknown Jamie Principle by mutual friend Jose "Louie" Gomez, who had recorded the original vocal-dub of "Your Love" to reel-to-reel tape. Louie Gomez met up with Frankie at the local record pool (I.R.S.) and gave him a tape copy of the track. Knuckles played Gomez's unreleased dub mix for an entire year in his sets during which it became a crowd favorite. Knuckles later went into the studio to re-record the track with Principle, and in 1987 helped put Your Love and Baby Wants to Ride out on vinyl after these tunes had been regulars on his reel-to-reel player at the Warehouse for a year.

As house music was developing in Chicago, producer Chip E. took Knuckles under his tutelage and produced Knuckles' first recording, "You Can't Hide from Yourself". Then came more production work, including Jamie Principle's "Baby Wants to Ride", and later "Tears" with Robert Owens (of Fingers Inc.) and (Knuckles' protégé and future Def Mix associate) Satoshi Tomiie.

1990s–2010s

Knuckles made numerous popular Def Classic Mixes with John Poppo as sound engineer, and Knuckles partnered with David Morales on Def Mix Productions. His debut album Beyond the Mix (1991), released on Virgin Records, contained what would be considered his seminal work, "The Whistle Song", which was the first of four number ones on the US dance chart. The Def Classic mix of Lisa Stansfield's "Change", released in the same year, also featured the whistle-like motif. Another track from the album, "Rain Falls", featured vocals from Lisa Michaelis. Eight thousand copies of the album had sold by 2004. Other key remixes from this time include his rework of the Electribe 101 anthem "Talking with Myself" and Alison Limerick's "Where Love Lives".

When Junior Vasquez took a sabbatical from The Sound Factory in Manhattan, Knuckles took over and launched a successful run as resident DJ. He continued to work as a remixer through the 1990s and into the next decade, reworking tracks from Michael Jackson, Luther Vandross, Diana Ross, Eternal and Toni Braxton. He released several new singles, including "Keep on Movin'" and a re-issue of an earlier hit "Bac N Da Day" with Definity Records. In 1995, he released his second album titled Welcome to the Real World. By 2004, 13,000 copies had sold.

Openly gay, Knuckles was inducted into the Chicago Gay and Lesbian Hall of Fame in 1996.

In 2004, Knuckles released a 13-track album of original material – his first in over a decade – titled A New Reality.

Death
In the mid-2000s, Knuckles developed Type II diabetes. He developed osteomyelitis after breaking his foot snowboarding, and had it amputated after declining to take time off for treatment. On March 31, 2014, he died in Chicago at the age of 59 due to the complications from his diabetes.

Legacy
In April 2015, a year after his death, Defected Records released a retrospective compilation, House Masters Frankie Knuckles; Knuckles had selected the track list before his death. Also, the same month, as a tribute to Knuckles, a version of his song "Baby Wants to Ride" was released by Underworld and Heller and Farley to mark the year anniversary of his death. It went straight to number one on the UK's first ever Official Vinyl Singles Chart. All proceeds went to the Frankie Knuckles Trust/Elton John AIDS Foundation. A year after his death, on April 4, 2015, an In Memoriam Essential Mix on BBC Radio 1 was played containing two previously unreleased Knuckles mixes.
Knuckles was featured in the documentary films Maestro (2003), written and directed by Josell Ramos, The UnUsual Suspects: Once Upon a Time in House Music (2005), directed by Chip E. and Continental (2013) about the Continental Baths.

Frankie Knuckles famously referred to house music as "disco's revenge" – a phrase that has been lauded by artists and DJs since his passing.

Awards and honors

In 1997, Knuckles won the Grammy Award for Remixer of the Year, Non-Classical. In 2004, the city of Chicago – which "became notorious in the dance community around the world for passing the so-called 'anti-rave ordinance' in 2000 that made property owners, promoters and deejays subject to $10,000 fines for being involved in an unlicensed dance party" – named a stretch of street in Chicago after Knuckles, where the old Warehouse once stood, on Jefferson Street between Jackson Boulevard and Madison Street. That stretch of street, called Frankie Knuckles Way, "was renamed when the city declared 25 August 2004 as Frankie Knuckles Day. The Illinois state senator who helped make it happen was Barack Obama. In 2005, Knuckles was inducted into the Dance Music Hall of Fame for his achievements.

DJ Magazine Top 100 DJs

Discography

Beyond the Mix (1991)
Welcome to the Real World (1995)

See also
Club Zanzibar (black electronic-music venue  in 1980s-era Newark, New Jersey)
List of artists who reached number one on the US Dance chart
List of number-one dance hits (United States)

References

External links

1955 births
2014 deaths
20th-century American musicians
21st-century American musicians
African-American DJs
American dance musicians
American electronic musicians
American house musicians
Club DJs
House DJs
Electronic dance music DJs
Deaths from diabetes
American gay musicians
Grammy Award winners
LGBT African Americans
LGBT DJs
LGBT people from Illinois
LGBT people from New York (state)
Musicians from Chicago
Musicians from New York City
DJs from New York City
People from the Bronx
Remixers
Virgin Records artists
Deep house musicians
20th-century American male musicians
21st-century American male musicians
20th-century American LGBT people
21st-century LGBT people
20th-century African-American musicians
21st-century African-American musicians